The A19 highway is a highway in Lithuania (Magistralinis kelias). Route in its current phase mainly runs through suburb of Aukštieji Paneriai in Vilnius. The length of the road is 7.9 km. The road is incomplete yet. It is planned that, the road will serve as Greater Southern bypass of Vilnius. It will connect roads A15 and A3. The profile of the new planned road will be 1+1.

Road in its current phase has 2+2 profile. It is a result of the widening works of an old narrow 1+1 profile road, that was part of the route 106. Works completed in 2013.

References 

Roads in Lithuania